Seven ships of the Royal Navy have borne the name HMS Winchelsea, or the archaic variant HMS Winchelsey, after the Sussex town of Winchelsea:

  was a 32-gun fifth rate launched in 1694 and captured by four French privateers in 1706.
  was a 26-gun fifth rate launched in 1706 and lost in a hurricane in 1707.
  was a 36-gun fifth rate purchased in 1708.  She was captured by the French in 1709, but was retaken a month later. She was reduced to a sixth rate in 1716 and was broken up in 1735.
  was a 20-gun sixth rate launched in 1740. She was captured by the French in 1758, but was retaken two weeks later. She was broken up in 1761.
  was a cutter purchased in 1763 and sunk as a breakwater in 1774.
  was a 32-gun fifth rate launched in 1764. She was rebuilt in 1782, converted into a prison ship in 1805 and was sold in 1814.
  was an Admiralty W-class destroyer launched in 1917. She was converted to an escort destroyer in 1942 and was sold in 1945.

See also
 , an East Indiaman

Royal Navy ship names